Education in Barbados is based primarily on the British model.

Overview 
Universal access to primary and secondary education dates from at least the 1960s. The  literacy rate in Barbados for youth and adults are both above 99%, only falling to 98.5 among the elderly. The literacy gender parity rate is 1.0. This information is for 2014.

Starting in 2000, the government initiated the Education Sector Enhancement Programme, usually referred to as EduTech 2000. This USD 213 million project was financed by the Government of Barbados (45%), the Inter-American Development Bank (40% and the Caribbean Development Bank (15%). This initiative provided for four key improvements: (a) repairs to 73 of the public primary and secondary school buildings; (b) new units established by the Ministry to support new teaching methodologies, including the Shell Media Resources Review Center, the National Educational Evaluation and Research Centre (at the University of the West Indies, Cave Hill), and a Programme office within the Ministry; enhancements to the technological availability (new computers, software and networking); (d) in-service training for all teachers in technology integration, child-centred methodologies, and special needs education; and (e) curricular reform to respond to changes in Barbados society. The key conceptual foundations for the initiative are constructivism and child-centred education. Most of the in-service training was provided by Erdiston Teachers' Training College.

Institutions
As of 2015-16, there are:
10 public nursery schools,
14 private nursery schools,
68 public primary schools (of which 67 offer pre-primary education),
26 private primary/mixed schools,
3 public special needs schools (and 4 public primary schools with special needs services),
4 private special needs schools,
22 public secondary schools (of which nine offer sixth form),
9 private secondary/mixed schools

5 tertiary- or vocational-level institutions
 UWI Cave Hill
Barbados Community College (BCC)
The Samuel Jackman Prescod Institute of Technology (SJPI)
Codrington College
Erdiston Teachers' Training College
American University of Barbados

1 central administrative agency, Ministry of Education, Technological and Vocational Training, including inter alia
Media Resources Department
Higher Education Development Unit
Education Project Implementation Unit

School Year

The Barbadian school year is fashioned after the British system, and as such, it follows a scheduling with three terms per school year.

The first term begins the second week of September and continues for 15 weeks adjourning in mid-December excluding one week for Mid Term Break in Mid-October. The second Term begins in the first week of January and continues for 12 weeks ending the end of March. The final Third Term begins mid-April and continues for 11 weeks until the end of June.

The School Holiday period is 9 to 10 weeks long from the end of June until the first week of September.

Education is provided free of charge and is compulsory between the ages of 5 and 16, and attendance is strictly enforced.  In 1991, the gross primary enrollment rate was 90.4 percent.

It was reported that Barbados has spent roughly US$15 billion on Education since Independence in 1966. In 2006 during the inaugural Cecil F. deCaires Memorial Lecture at the Frank Collymore Hall, the former Central Bank Governor Sir Courtney Blackman remarked that between 1966 and 2000 successive Governments (of Barbados) had spent US$15 billion on education costs – "a remarkable investment for such a small state".

In 2009, Ronald Jones as the Minister of Education and Human Resource Development said the Barbados government spent $290 million to upgrade the schools with information technology.  Given this Jones said the ministry would be entering a grading processes for schools on their usage of the technology using a scale of 1 to 6.

Footnotes

See also
Caribbean Examinations Council (CXC)
Education in the United Kingdom
List of schools in Barbados
National Library Service of Barbados
School uniforms

References
Min. of Education: HISTORICAL DEVELOPMENTS OF EDUCATION IN BARBADOS 1686 – 2000
TotalBarbados.com: Education in Barbados
Early Developments In Barbadian Education
U.S. Library of Congress: Education in Barbados
U.S. State Department: Education in Barbados
Barbados, Commonwealth of Learning Network Statistics

External links
Ministry of Education, Technological and Vocational Training - Official website
The Barbados Accreditation Council
Statistics and more statistics about education in Barbados
World Data on Education 2010/2011 - Barbados (International Bureau of Education / Unesco)
Country Dossiers: Barbados (International Bureau of Education / Unesco) 
Vocational Education & training in Barbados, UNESCO-UNEVOC country profile
Educational Research in Barbados, webdossier by the portal Education Worldwide (German Education Server)
Technical and Vocational Education and Training (TVET) Council
Bajans thrive in NY schools

 
Society of Barbados